Maxime Vandelannoitte (born 23 January 2002) is a Belgian footballer who currently plays as a defender for K.S.V. Roeselare.

Career statistics

Club

Notes

References

2002 births
Living people
Belgian footballers
Association football defenders
Challenger Pro League players
K.S.V. Roeselare players